The 2019 FIBA 3x3 Asia Cup was the fourth edition of the FIBA 3x3 Asia Cup. The games of the final tournament were held in Changsha, China between 24 May and 26 May 2019.

Participating teams

The FIBA 3x3 Asia Cup has a men's and women's tournament, each contested by twelve national teams. The teams were drawn into their groups as per their FIBA 3x3 Federation Ranking as of March 1, 2019. Nine teams for the men's team and ten teams for the women's team outright qualified for the final tournament while the remaining berths were contested in a qualification phase held from 22 to 23 May, 2019.

Main tournaments

Men

Women

Individual contests

Shoot-out contest (mixed)

 (2)
 (2)
 (2)
 (2)
 (1)
 (2)
 (2)
 (1)
 (2)
 (2)
 (2)
 (1)
 (2)
 (2)
 (2)
 (1)
 (2)
 (1)
 (2)
 (2)
 (2)
 (2)
 (1)

Medalists

References

External links
 Official website

3x3 Asia Cup
International basketball competitions hosted by China
Asia Cup
FIBA 3x3 Asia Cup
FIBA Asia 3x3 Cup